Patrick Henry High School is a public high school in Hamler, Ohio.  It is the only high school in the Patrick Henry Local Schools district. Named for American Founding Father Patrick Henry, their nickname is the Patriots with their colors being Red, White, and Blue. They are members of the Northwest Ohio Athletic League. Patrick Henry consolidated in 1969 and houses students from Hamler, Deshler and Malinta, Ohio.

Academics
The Ohio Department of Education ranked the district as Excellent from 2002 to 2012, and it has also been included in a national "Top 100 High Schools That Work" grouping.

Activities
Students can participate in the school's pep band, spring musical, yearbook, student council, National Honor Society, quiz team, Fellowship of Christian Athletes, and clubs for art, Spanish, science, math, the Renaissance, robotics, books, and poetry.

The school fields sports teams in football, baseball, boys' and girls' basketball, boys' and girls' track, volleyball, cheerleading, boys' and girls' cross country, gymnastics, wrestling, golf, softball, bowling, and archery.

Ohio High School Athletic Association State Championships

 Boys Baseball - 2008, 2009
 Boys Football – 2005
 Boys Basketball – 1997

NWOAL championships (1978-)
Football: 1996, 1997, 2002*, 2003, 2004, 2005, 2006*, 2007*, 2008, 2009, 2016, 2018
Volleyball: 2005
Girls Cross Country: 1993
Boys Basketball: 1982-83, 1983–84, 1985–86, 1991-92*, 1996-97*, 1997-98*, 1998-99*, 2005–06, 2006–07
Girls Basketball: 1986-87*, 1987–88, 1989–90, 2001–02, 2002–03, 2004–05, 2005–06
Baseball: 2002*, 2003, 2006, 2007
Girls Track & Field: 1994, 1995, 2010

Northern Border League championships (1969-1978)
Football: 1971, 1977
Boys Cross Country: 1976
Boys Basketball: 1972-73, 1973-74*, 1976–77
Wrestling: 1971-72
Girls Basketball: 1976-77, 1977–78
Baseball: 1971, 1972*, 1974*, 1975*, 1978

Note: shared league titles are denoted with an asterisk (*)

Alumni
Marc Krauss, outfielder, 1st baseman

References

External links
 District Website

High schools in Henry County, Ohio
Public high schools in Ohio